The 2005 National Premier Soccer League season was the 3rd season of the NPSL. Prior to the beginning of the year the league changed its name from the Mens Premier Soccer League to the National Premier Soccer League, to recognize the league's eastward expansion and the creation of the new Midwest Division.

Expansion franchise Detroit Arsenal finished the season as national champions, beating Sonoma County Sol in the NPSL Championship game

Changes From 2004

New franchises
Eight franchises joined the league this year, all expansion franchises:

Folding
Four teams left the league prior to the beginning of the season:
Arizona Sahuaros - Phoenix, Arizona
Idaho Wolves - Idaho Falls, Idaho
Northern Nevada Aces - Reno, Nevada
Utah Salt Ratz - Salt Lake City, Utah

Final standings
Purple indicates division title clinched
Green indicates playoff berth clinched

West Division

Midwest Division

Playoffs

Semi finals
Sonoma County Sol beat Sacramento Knights
Detroit Arsenal beat Milwaukee Bavarians

Final
Detroit Arsenal 1-0 Sonoma County Sol

Bracket

References
 US soccer history archives for 2005

2005
4